Richard George Causton  (17 February 1920 – 13 January 1995) was a British author, businessman, and the first chairman of the Soka Gakkai International in the UK (SGI-UK).

Early life 
Causton was born in London on 17 February 1920. Educated at Dulwich College, Causton attended the Royal Military College, Sandhurst. During World War II, at the age of 24, he was stationed on the borders of India and Burma. He served as a Brigade-Major of the Allied Forces. In Northeast India, he experienced the attacks of the Japanese army. In 1958, he retired from the army.

Career 
 At 38, Causton began a career in business. After working as Vice General Manager of the department store Harrods in London, he became a sales representative of Dunhill in the Far East. While in Japan, he met his future wife, Mitsuko, who introduced him to Nichiren Buddhism, and the Soka Gakkai in Japan. These experiences led him to become a practicing Buddhist in 1971.

In March 1974, Causton moved with Mitsuko to London. In 1975, the SGI-UK was officially founded and Causton became its first chairman. He directed numerous cultural activities of SGI-UK, and co-founded the United Nations High Commissioner for Refugees and the Commonwealth Human Ecology Council together with other humanitarian organizations.

In 1995, Causton authored a book about the Soka Gakkai International and Nichiren Buddhism titled The Buddha in Daily Life.

Publications 
 Causton, Richard: Nichiren Shoshu Buddhism, HarperCollins Publishers, 1989; 
 Causton, Richard: The Buddha In Daily Life: An Introduction to the Buddhism of Nichiren Daishonin, Rider Publishing, London, 1995;

References

External links  
 Soka Gakkai International of the United Kingdom (SGI-UK)

20th-century British businesspeople
1920 births
1995 deaths
British Army personnel of World War II
Nichiren Buddhism
British writers
British Buddhists
Nichiren Buddhists
Members of Sōka Gakkai
Converts to Sōka Gakkai
Border Regiment officers
Graduates of the Royal Military College, Sandhurst
Recipients of the Military Cross